Yakobi Island is an uninhabited island in the Alexander Archipelago of southeastern Alaska, United States. It lies to the south of Cross Sound and just off the western edge of Chichagof Island, separated from it by Lisianski Inlet and Lisianski Strait. The island has a land area of 82.37 sq mi (213.3 km2) and no permanent resident population.

Yakobi Island was named by Baranov after Ivan Iakobi, the governor-general of Irkutsk and Kolyvan.  The Tlingit name for the island is Takhanes.

See also
West Chichagof-Yakobi Wilderness

References

Yakobi Island: Block 1018, Census Tract 3, Skagway-Hoonah-Angoon Census Area, Alaska United States Census Bureau

Islands of the Alexander Archipelago
Islands of Hoonah–Angoon Census Area, Alaska
Tongass National Forest
Islands of Alaska
Islands of Unorganized Borough, Alaska
Uninhabited islands of Alaska